Outcasts is a 2011 British television science-fiction drama serial, starring Liam Cunningham, Hermione Norris, Amy Manson, Daniel Mays, Eric Mabius and Ashley Walters. It originally aired on BBC One, and BBC HD. It was broadcast in the United States on BBC America.

Plot
Outcasts is set in the year 2060 on the fictional planet Carpathia, a habitable planet five years travel from Earth. Carpathia has been colonized by a succession of spaceships fleeing destruction and nuclear conflict back on Earth. Most of the planet's population is living within the limits of the pioneer town Forthaven, which was first settled ten years before the time of the beginning of the series. The Carpathians live in ignorance of Earth's fate, receiving news only through the few evacuee transporter ships that successfully pass through the difficult atmospheric entry to Carpathia.

The story focuses on the President of Carpathia, Richard Tate, and core members of the Protection and Security (PAS) team, as well as Expeditionaries (XPs), whose role is to explore the planet on foot and retrieve resources and medicines. With the arrival of CT-9, perhaps the last transporter that will reach Carpathia from Earth, the storylines revolve around the ongoing lives of the existing settlers, the induction of new evacuees into the Forthaven community and the effect of others living outside the walls of Forthaven.

Science fiction elements
While much of the series deals with human relationships in a hostile environment, there are a number of sci-fi elements – such as being set in the future, on a planet in a faraway solar system, after some sort of global catastrophe.

The Advanced Cultivars (ACs) are a group of genetically enhanced humans designed to survive in harsh conditions. Early in the colonisation, they were wrongly accused of being the carriers/source of a plague which killed many of the new colony's children, including those of President Tate. Some of the ACs have specific problems due to their conditioning. They are supposedly sterile.

Though the planet has only simple native animals and birds, over the course of the series the colony discovers evidence of both an extinct native hominid species and a mysterious alien intelligence capable of manifesting physical entities based on the colonists.

The Deep Brain Visualization (DBV) machine translates brain activity into visual images on a screen showing what the person remembers. The person sits in a reclining chair with their head between two blocks containing sensors to non-invasively collect the data.

Cast
 Liam Cunningham as President Richard Tate
 Hermione Norris as Dr. Stella Isen, Head of Protection and Security (PAS)
 Daniel Mays as PAS Officer Cass Cromwell
 Amy Manson as PAS Officer Fleur Morgan
 Ashley Walters as Expeditionary Jack Holt
 Michael Legge as Tipper Malone, an anti-authoritarian black marketeer
 Eric Mabius as Julius Berger, former Vice President of the Earth Evacuation Programme
 Laura Greenwood as Aisling
 Langley Kirkwood as Rudi
 Imdad Miah as Santi
 Patrick Lyster as Captain Kellermann, commander of CT-9 (Colony Transporter 9)
 Jeanne Kietzmann as Lily Isen, Stella's daughter
 Jamie Bamber as Mitchell Hoban, Head of the Expeditionaries (XPs) His Psych profile gives his date of birth (12/03/2023) and indicates that he may suffer from multiple personality disorder.
 Juliet Aubrey as Josie Hunter

Production
In development since 2007, produced by Kudos Film & Television for BBC One, the series started shooting in South Africa in May 2010, coinciding with the 2010 FIFA World Cup being held there. According to David Stephenson, writing in the Daily Express, the original scripts underwent 25 rewrites.

Episodes

Reception
Writing in The Independent, Brian Viner admitted that at first Outcasts rekindled his prejudices about science fiction but he was gradually sucked in. The first episode was "well written", "smartly directed" and "splendidly acted". These quotes are also used as blurb on the cover of the Blu-ray Disc release of the series.

However, other reviews for the series were generally more negative. Reviewing for The Daily Telegraph, Chris Harvey found it "one of the most staggeringly uninteresting dramas that’s been on television for a while", "drab" and "pretty turgid human drama."

Kevin O'Sullivan writing for The Daily Mirror said, "Hermione Norris and Daniel Mays in excrutiating sci-fi rubbish", and "Who directed it? Ed Wood? And what a script! So jaw-droppingly dreadful it hurt".

The Times reviewer, David Chater wrote, "Not since Bonekickers has the BBC broadcast such an irredeemably awful series. Sometimes catastrophes on this scale can be enjoyed precisely because they are so dismal, but this one has a kind of grinding badness that defies enjoyment of any kind".

Andrew Anthony for The Observer concluded, "All along I've been misreading the series as a kind of cosmic tragedy when in reality it was a tragic comedy. It wasn't trying to be wise. Deep down, Carpathia was pure Morecambe."

Discussion of the series and its plot/script issues took place across various sites, including The Guardian'''s episode by episode review by Phelim O'Neill, an interactive interview with writer/creator Ben Richards, and at Digital Spy.

Audience figures for the series were poor: starting from an initial low figure of 4.5 million viewers for the pilot episode, the show lost nearly two-thirds over its run, to finish with 1.56 million UK viewers.

Scheduling and cancellation
Having originally launched on Mondays and Tuesdays at 21:00, The Guardian reported that after disappointing ratings, the fifth episode would be the last in this prime time slot, with subsequent episodes being rescheduled to late nights on Sundays.

Ben Richards, the writer/creator of the show, remained defiant, commenting, "I have every confidence we will rule our new slot. Clear eyes, full hearts, can't lose!" and "Cultdom beckons. And keep watching hardcore because remaining eps great."

On 14 March 2011 (the day following the final episode), the BBC confirmed that Outcasts'' had been cancelled, and that there would be no second series. A second series was in planning by this point, and some scenes had actually been shot, which Richards has said he intends to write as a novel instead.

International broadcast

DVD releases
Outcasts was released as both a three-disc DVD and two-disc Blu-ray Disc package on the 4 April 2011, through 2 Entertain, BBFC rated 15.

References

External links
 
 

2010s British science fiction television series
2011 British television series debuts
2011 British television series endings
British science fiction television shows
BBC television dramas
Space adventure television series
English-language television shows
Post-apocalyptic television series
Television series about colonialism